is a 2012 Japanese drama film directed by Yukiko Mishima and starring Tomoyo Harada, Yo Oizumi and Kanna Mori.

Bread of Happiness was first released in cinemas located in Hokkaido on 21 January 2012, and was subsequently released in other Japanese cinemas on 28 January 2012. It had grossed US$717,956 as of 29 January 2012.

Plot
Rie and Nao own a bakery-cum-restaurant named Mani on the shores of Lake Toya, Hokkaido. Nao is the baker who bakes the bakery's bread, while Rie is the chef who prepares the food in the restaurant. Graced with beautiful scenery throughout the four seasons, this shop serves a variety of customers, some of whom are having personal problems. However, after they leave the shop, they feel only happiness.

Cast
 Tomoyo Harada as Rie Mizushima
 Yo Oizumi as Nao Mizushima
 Kanna Mori as Kaori Saito
 Yuta Hiraoka as Tokio Yamashita
 Yuki Yagi as Suehisa
 Ken Mitsuishi as Suehisa's father
 Reika Kirishima as Suehisa's mother
 Misako Watanabe as Aya Sakamoto
 Katsuo Nakamura as Shio Sakamoto
 Chikara Honda as the postman
 Nobue Iketani as Mrs. Hirokawa
 Katsuo Nakamura as Mr. Hirokawa
 Morio Agata as Mr. Abe
 Kimiko Yo as Yōko
 Nozomi Ohashi as the voice of the young female narrator

Production

Development
Bread of Happiness was first announced on 9 September 2010. The film was directed by Yukiko Mishima, who was also in charge of the screenplay. The story of the film is set in Tokyo and Lake Toya, Hokkaido.

It was revealed in the initial announcement that actor Yo Oizumi and actress Tomoyo Harada would star as husband and wife in the film. The film marked the 30th anniversary of actress Harada's debut as an actress. It is also her first main role in a film since the 2006 film Kamiya Etsuko no Seishun.

Filming
Bread of Happiness was filmed around Lake Toya, which is located in Hokkaido, the home prefecture of Oizumi. Filming started on 9 September 2010. Before filming, Oizumi spent time as a baker's apprentice to prepare for the role.

Theme song
The theme song of the film is entitled , which was originally sung by Akiko Yano and Kyoshiro Imawano, and was first released in 1980.

Release
Bread of Happiness was first released in Hokkaido on 21 January 2012. It subsequently had a small-scale release in 47 cinemas throughout Japan on 28 January 2012. During its debut weekend, the film attracted an audience of 26100, and grossed a total of 36 million yen. This made it the 10th highest-grossing film in the Japanese box office for the weekend of 28–29 January 2012.

References

External links
  
 Official page 
 Trailer 
 

2012 films
Japanese drama films
2012 drama films
Films set in restaurants
Films set in Hokkaido
2010s Japanese films
2010s Japanese-language films